Lionel Taminiaux (born 21 May 1996) is a Belgian cyclist, who currently rides for UCI ProTeam .

Major results

2014
 2nd Kuurne–Brussels–Kuurne Juniors
 9th Overall Keizer der Juniores
2017
 3rd Grand Prix Criquielion
2018
 1st Grand Prix Criquielion
 1st  Points classification, Istrian Spring Trophy
 8th Omloop Het Nieuwsblad Beloften
 9th Internationale Wielertrofee Jong Maar Moedig
 9th Paris–Roubaix Espoirs
2019
 1st La Roue Tourangelle
 1st  Mountains classification, Four Days of Dunkirk
 3rd Rund um Köln
 6th Halle–Ingooigem
 7th Route Adélie
 8th Dwars door het Hageland
 9th Grand Prix Pino Cerami
2021
 3rd Binche–Chimay–Binche
 8th Gooikse Pijl
2022
 1st Stage 4 Four Days of Dunkirk
 1st Stage 5 Tour de Langkawi
 7th Grote Prijs Marcel Kint
 8th Veenendaal–Veenendaal Classic
 8th Circuit de Wallonie
2023
 4th Bredene Koksijde Classic

Grand Tour general classification results timeline

References

External links

1996 births
Living people
Belgian male cyclists
People from Ottignies-Louvain-la-Neuve
Cyclists from Walloon Brabant